Jang Keun-suk is a South Korean actor and singer. He is best known for starring in the Korean television dramas Beethoven Virus (2008), You're Beautiful (2009), Mary Stayed Out All Night (2010), Love Rain (2012), Pretty Man (2013), The Royal Gambler (2016), and Switch (2018).

Early life
Jang started working as a child model at the age of five after he was discovered by a talent agent. At that time, Jang's parents were selling their house and the agent, who was a prospective buyer, saw Jang. Seeing his potential, the agent advised Jang's parents to allow him to try a career in modeling.

In junior high school, Jang went to school in New Zealand, where he attended Nelson College in 2003, to learn English and Japanese.

Film career

Pre-debut
Jang made his acting debut in the 1997 HBS (now Channel CGV) sitcom Selling Happiness. He then continued to work in television as a child actor. Studying in New Zealand at the time, a role in the popular MBC sitcom Nonstop 4 brought him back to South Korea.

2005–2008: Beginnings
In 2005, Jang played the president's son in the SBS drama Lovers in Prague.

In 2006, Jang debuted on the big screen in the Japanese horror film One Missed Call: Final where he played the role of a deaf boy. He next played the first love of famous gisaeng Hwang Jini (played by Ha Ji-won) in the period drama Hwang Jini.

In 2007, Jang was cast in the rock music-themed film The Happy Life, directed by Lee Joon-ik. Jang then co-hosted SBS's weekly live music show Inkigayo from February 25 to October 7, 2007.

In 2008, Jang would go on to act in two more music-inspired projects with the film Do Re Mi Fa So La Ti Do, and the MBC drama Beethoven Virus opposite Kim Myung-min, in which he played a trumpet player in an orchestra. He also starred in the KBS drama, Hong Gil-dong as the fictional brother of King Gwanghae who vies for Joseon's throne. Afterwards, he starred opposite Moon Mason in the movie Baby and I.

2009–2013: Overseas popularity
Jang gained more recognition after starring in You're Beautiful (2009), playing the leader of fictional K-pop band A.N.Jell, who falls in love with a fellow band member who is a girl pretending to be her twin brother (played by Park Shin-hye). The series gained a cult following, and earned high ratings in Japan.

The same year, he took on his first villain role in the thriller The Case of Itaewon Homicide, based on the real-life Itaewon murder case in which a young Korean-American was accused of stabbing a Korean student to death. Jang spoke his lines in English throughout the entire film, and Beyond Hollywood praised him as having "performed very well" in the role.

In 2010, he starred opposite Moon Geun-young in the romantic comedy series Mary Stayed Out All Night. This was followed by another rom-com  You're My Pet, adapted from the Japanese manga Kimi wa Petto in which a younger man willingly becomes the "pet" of a career woman (played by Kim Ha-neul). In 2011, Jang starred in the short film Budapest Diary, reportedly participated in the writing and location scouting for the film.

Jang then worked with TV director Yoon Seok-ho on the melodrama series Love Rain, in which he and costar Im Yoon-ah played dual roles in the 1970s and 2012. The drama garnered much positive overseas interest and was sold to Japan for $10 million, the second highest price for a KBS drama at the time, partly due to Jang's popularity.

In 2013, Jang starred in another series adapted from a manhwa, Pretty Man opposite IU.

2015: Scandal and hiatus, directorial debut
Jang filmed the reality show Three Meals a Day: Fishing Village with Cha Seung-won and Yoo Hae-jin, which was supposed to air in January 2015. He had previously been involved in similar rumors in October 2014 (though the rumor was denied). Jang was eventually found not guilty of tax evasion as his agency had made an unintentional accounting mistake, but made a decision to leave the program and his scenes were edited out. He went on a hiatus in Korea after that, and focused largely on overseas activities.

That same year, Jang launched his directorial debut with the short film Camp, participating in the planning and directing stages in collaboration with director Yoon Hong-seung. Filmed in Jeju Island, Camp captures events that occur during Jang's attempts to film wild animals in the mountains as a documentary director. It topped the weekly film section of the Oricon Chart.

He expressed his desire to be recognized as an actor in Korea again, saying that "You may be a Hallyu star, but without a domestic base, it can feel empty." He announced that he will be selecting an "aggressive" range of movies and TV series to work on in 2016.

2016–present: Comeback
Jang made a successful comeback in 2016 with Mnet's music survival show Produce 101, where 101 trainee girls competed against each other for their debut.
He acted as the host and mentor of the show, making significant contributions toward introducing the program to viewers and making the program more suspenseful.

Jang then starred in the historical drama The Royal Gambler where he played a gambler who takes on the King. Though it had lower viewership ratings, the series marked a turning point in Jang's career and allowed him to overcome his fixed image as a "pretty boy" and expand his acting roles. The same year, Jang directed the short film The Great Legacy, which centers on a man who is obsessed with finding a bankbook left by his unconscious father. The film was invited for screening at the Bucheon International Fantastic Film Festival.

In 2017, Jang was cast in Kim Ki-duk's film Human, Space, Time and Human, about a journey to get to the root of being human while testing the limits of human emotions, morality, and ethics.

In 2018, Jang returned to the small screen with the drama Switch - Change the World, playing double roles as a prosecutor and a con artist.

Music career
Jang's first single as a singer, "Let Me Cry," was released by Pony Canyon in Japan on April 27, 2011. "Let Me Cry" debuted at number 1 on Japan's Oricon single charts, selling 119,149 copies on its first week of release, making him the first non-Japanese act to have the debut single to debut at number 1 on the charts. This won him Best New Artist in the 26th Japan Gold Disc Awards.

In September 2011, Jang teamed up with Big Brother (known as Team H) and released their first Chinese album, an EP titled The Lounge H Vol.1 in mainland China, Taiwan, Hong Kong and throughout Southeast Asia. The album eventually reached platinum sales. Team H later won Best Selling Album and Best Korean Album at the 2012 IFPI Hong Kong Record Sales Awards.

In March 2012, Team H released their second extended play Lounge H (The First Impression) exclusively in Japan. The album contained ten tracks of rock and electronic genre.

In May 2012, Jang released his first full-length Japanese album, titled Just Crazy. It debuted at No. 1 on the Oricon daily singles chart with 53,000 copies sold, and again topped the weekly singles chart with 88,009 copies sold. Jang became the first male artist to top the Oricon Weekly Chart with a debut album, and the first time in Oricon history for a foreign male artist to claim such a feat in Japan.
An eight-page advertisement promoting the album was awarded a prize by the Japanese Press Association. Jang then embarked on his second Asia tour to promote the album.

In February 2013, Team H released their third album titled I Just Wanna Have Fun in both Japan and China, which consists of 12 electronic tracks. The duo held their first concert, 2013 Team H Party - I Just Wanna Have Fun in Japan; and embarked on a series of concert throughout China, Thailand, Taiwan and America.

In May 2013, Jang released his second Japanese album, Nature Boy, which consists of 11 tracks, including the promotional singles "Nature Boy" and "Indian Summer" as well as a self-written track titled "Love Letter". The album debuted at the top of the Oricon Daily Chart, selling 43,000 copies. From 2013 to 2014, Jang embarked on his first Zepp tour which traveled to different cities in Japan for a total of 14 concerts.

In 2014, Jang project band, Team H, released its third full-length album titled Driving to the Highway consisting of fourteen tracks. The duo then embarked on a concert tour in Japan titled  "Raining on the dance floor", which traveled to four different cities for a total of eight concerts.

In February 2015, Jang released his third solo album ‘Monochrome’ to celebrate his fifth anniversary in Japan. Monochrome placed third on both the ‘Oricon’ album daily and weekly chart. He also launched the 2015 "Jang Keun Suk The Cri Show 3" around Japan. The tour, which began with the Osaka concert on March 14, has completely sold out tickets for the 12 hall concerts in six cities (Osaka, Niigata, Fukuoka, Okayama, Shizuika, Hokkaido) and four arena concerts in two cities (Kobe, Tokyo), for a total of 16 concerts.

In September 2015, Jang held the "Jang Keun Suk Live in Seoul 2015" concert at the Changchun Stadium in Seoul. It was Jang's first solo concert in Korea in three years. On October 24 Jang held a concert in Shanghai which was a comeback concert in China since 2013, followed by 4 concerts in Japan in the end of November.

In August 2016, Jang released a new Japanese single titled "Darling, Darling". Jang then kicked off his Asia tour "It's Show Time", performing in Seoul, Japan and China. He went on to unveil two more singles, "Endless Summer" and "Dakishimetai" the same year.

In August 2017, Jang dropped his 4th full-length album Voyage with a total of 14 songs, including three singles released in 2016. The album took second place on the Oricon daily and weekly charts, selling over 21,000 copies the first day.

In March/April 2021, Jang released two new singles entitled "Star" and "Emotion" under EMI Records.

On the March 23, 2022, Jang released a teaser video for the title track 'Running Through Time' of his new Japanese album 'Blooming'.

On August 11, 2022, Jang released the second teaser video for his new title track 'Beautiful', which will be released on August 31.

In the media
Jang has been referred to as the "Prince of Asia" due to his overwhelming popularity in the region, particularly China and Japan. In 2012, Jang became the first Hallyu star to be featured on a Japanese stamp. In 2013, his followers on Chinese networking social site Weibo surpassed 10 million, the greatest number of followers on Weibo for a Korean celebrity.

Personal life
Jang started his mandatory military service on July 16, 2018. He served as a social office worker following his diagnosis of bipolar disorder in 2011, which classified him as ineligible for active duty in the military.
He served at Seoul Metropolitan Fire and Disaster Headquarters and completed his military service on May 29, 2020.

Social activities
In 2010, Jang became the youngest person to be named PR Ambassador for Seoul.

Jang was named promotional ambassador of the Nuclear Safety Summit in 2011.

On 20 October 2015, Jang was appointed as one of the first domestic university "Sharing Professors" by Hanyang university. He held his first special lectures in December 2015.

In 2016, Jang was appointed as a public ambassador for the media art exhibition “Van Gogh Inside: Festival of Music and Light".

In 2017, Jang was named honorary ambassador for the PyeongChang Olympics.

Philanthropy
Jang often donates to charitable causes; in 2011 he donated 10.1 million yen from his charity event for its earthquake and tsunami victims to the Japanese Red Cross. In 2012 he donated an unprecedented sum of 1.2 billion won to his school, and in 2013 he donated 100 million won through UNICEF to help the victims of Typhoon Haiyan that devastated the Philippines. In 2017, it was revealed that he helped a Mongolian teenager get treatment for ovarian cancer in South Korea by helping to pay for the patient's trip and medical expenses.

His fanclub also makes donations frequently, such as to The Snail of Love, an organization that supports people with hearing impairments. and to the Namsanwon orphanage. In 2015, Jang volunteered at the said orphanage together with his fans.

In 2016, Jang stated that he wished to create a charity foundation to take his philanthropic activities a step further.

In 2022, Jang donated 30 million to help deaf children by donating with fans through the Association for the Support of the Hearing Impaired.

On February 9, 2023, Jang donated 100 million won to help 2023 Turkey–Syria earthquake, by donating money through Korea UNICEF Committee.

Filmography

Film

Television series

Web series

Variety show

Radio shows

Discography

Book
2012: Jang Keun Suk Love Recipe

Awards and nominations

State honors

Notes

References

External links

 
  

 

Living people
21st-century South Korean male actors
South Korean male television actors
South Korean male film actors
South Korean pop singers
People from North Chungcheong Province
People educated at Nelson College
Pony Canyon artists
People with bipolar disorder
21st-century South Korean  male singers
1987 births
Best New Actor Paeksang Arts Award (film) winners